Brunei first competed at the Asian Games in 1990.

Medal tables

Medals by Asian Games

List of medalists

Medals by sport

Asian Para Games

Medals by Games

References